Rocky – The Rebel is an Indian Hindi-language action drama film directed by Suresh Krisna. The film stars Zayed Khan, Isha Sharvani and Minissha Lamba and Rajat Bedi. The film revolves around a young man Rocky, who cannot withstand injustice and gets into fights. However he finds himself in trouble after involving with a gangster. It is an official remake of Telugu film Raghavendra (2003).

Plot

Rocky is a man who lives in Mumbai with his parents. Rocky's weaknesses is his very short-tempered, and unruly behaviour. He often gets into fights against injustice. One day he gets into a fight with a man who works for a criminal named Anthony and beats him up. Anthony warns him not to cross paths with him. One day while Rocky is with his girlfriend Neha, he sends Anthony's brother to the hospital. When Anthony finds out, he confronts Rocky and Neha and kills Neha. He mocks at Rocky. An angered Rocky loses control of himself, making his family turn him away. Anthony threatens Rocky's family to leave Mumbai. The family along with Rocky eventually moves to London. There Rocky tries to forget his past life. His father lied to him that Anthony has been sentenced to death by the court. Three months later, Rocky's friend, Vikram Singh, visits to inform them of the progress of the criminal prosecution of Anthony. There Priya, a tour guide and Rocky's friend, is harassed by some people. When she shouted to Rocky for help, he unlike before, took a conservative path and walks away. Vikram tells Priya the truth about Rocky. The way he was living, why he's always quiet. Thereby Vikram tells him that Anthony has escaped the trial by killing both the eyewitnesses. On hearing this Rocky felt shattered and wants revenge. Later on Rocky travels back to India, along with his parents. Anthony learns that Rocky has returned to Mumbai. He then pays a visit to his home where he encounter Rocky's father. His father tells him to meet Rocky at the same spot where he had killed Neha several months ago. A fight ensues between Rocky and Anthony. At the end, though severely injured, Rocky is about to kill Anthony but Neha's soul stops him from doing so.

Cast
 Zayed Khan as Rocky Sinha
 Isha Sharvani as Neha Mathur
 Minissha Lamba as Priya Krantikari
 Rajat Bedi as Anthony D'Silva 
 Suresh Menon as Professor Bhimsen Krantikari: Priya's father 
 Sarath Babu as Ajay Sinha: Rocky's father 
 Smita Jaykar as Rocky's mother

Track listing

Critical reception
Tenzin Thargay from Rediff rated the film 2 out of 5, stating "it has nothing to offer". Taran Adarsh from Bollywood Hungama, rated the film 1 out of 5, citing it, "ROCKY is an outdated concept with nothing except action to fall back upon."

References

2000s Hindi-language films
Hindi remakes of Telugu films
2006 films
Films scored by Himesh Reshammiya
Films directed by Suresh Krissna
Indian action drama films
Films shot in London
Films shot in Mumbai
Films about murder
2000s action drama films
Films about death